Neoniphon argenteus, the clearfin squirrelfish or silver squirrelfish, is a seldom-seen member of the family Holocentridae. It is native to the Indian Ocean and Pacific Ocean from East Africa to New Caledonia. It is also found both north and south of Australia and throughout Micronesia. It lives mainly around islands and shallow reefs, and like N. sammara is associated with Acropora corals. It feeds primarily on benthic invertebrates. It is found in the ornamental trade and can be used as bait in tuna fisheries, but there are currently no known major threats to the species.

References

External links
 Fishes of Australia : Neoniphon argenteus
 

clearfin squirrelfish
Marine fish of Northern Australia
clearfin squirrelfish
Taxa named by Achille Valenciennes